Cica Zhou (born 26 August 1982) is a Chinese actress and model of Sui ethnicity.

Early life
Zhou was born and raised in Qiandongnan Miao and Dong Autonomous Prefecture, Guizhou. She graduated from Beijing Newface Model School.

Career
Zhou began her career as a fashion model in Beijing at age 17. In 2000, Zhou won the 6th China Model Star Contest and was rated as one of the China's top 10 professional models in 2000-01.

Zhou made her acting debut in Spring in the Summer (2004), playing Miao Ge.

Zhou's first film role was uncredited appearance in the film My Crazy Father (2005). That same year, she also had a minor role as Liu Man in True Love of Heaven and Earth.

In 2009, Zhou had a supporting role in Welcome to Shama Town, an adventure film starring Sun Honglei and Lin Chi-ling.

After playing minor roles in various films and television series, Zhou received her first leading role in the horror film Lost In Panic Cruise.

In 2012, Zhou co-starred with Kimi Qiao, Francis Ng and Lam Suet in Good-for-Nothing Heros as Lucy.

In 2013, Zhou participated in Silent Witness as Yang Dan, alongside Sun Honglei, Deng Jiajia, Tong Liya, Yu Nan, and Aaron Kwok.

Personal life
Zhou was married to a Taiwanese businessman Lin Didi in 2007, the couple divorced in 2010.

Filmography

Film

Television

Photo album
 Cica loves YOU! – , Shueisha.
 Loving, Cica

References

External links

 

1982 births
People from Qiandongnan
Living people
Actresses from Guizhou
Chinese film actresses
Chinese television actresses
Chinese female models
Sui people
The Amazing Race contestants